Peggi Blu is an American actress, singer and vocal coach. She is the 1986 "Star Search Grand Champion (Female Vocalist)" winner and the winner of the 2013 "Malibu Music Awards" ("Vocal Coach of the Year") award.  She is best known as an American Idol vocal coach'".

Early life 

Blu was born in Lumberton North Carolina and began singing at the age of 3.  A relocation to New York city at the age of 14 with her uncle Bishop Walter L. Benton and his choir opened the way to her professional career. Due to constant bookings and a demand for her vocals she was home-schooled.

Career 
Her career as a session background singer began in 1973 with Archie Shepp's "Rest Enough (Song To Mother)", from his "The Cry Of My People" album. Session work continued throughout the 1970s with artists such as Elkie Brooks, Esther Phillips, and Louis Farrakhan.  In 1980, she landed her first major label contract with MCA Records.

In 1987, the album Blu Blowin''' produced two minor R&B/hip hop hits with "Tender Moments"  and "All The Way With You".

 2000 and current 
In September 2002, Blu released her third album, Livin On Love, on Expansion Records. In 2006, Blu was featured on the short-lived ABC TV show "Miracle Workers" alongside good friend Charles Valentino. In 2007, Blu did backing vocals and vocal arrangements for the soundtrack to Adam Sandler's "I Now Pronounce You Chuck and Larry".

In 2010, Blu recorded with Danish/German duo Cool Million on their album "Back For More", which led to her appearance on their 2012 album "III". In 2011–2012, Blu was a judge and vocal coach on American Idol.

 Selected appearances discography 

 1973 Archie Schepp-The Cry of My People 1974 Lou Courtney-I'm in Need Of Love 1976 Esther Phillips w/Beck-For All We Know 1977 Elkie Brooks-Two Days Away 1980 Minister Louis Farrakhan-Heed The Call Y'all 1980 Various- Fame (Original Soundtrack From The Motion Picture)
 1982 Stephanie Mills-Tantalizingly Hot 1983 The Weather Girls- Success 1983 Stephanie Mills- Merciless 1985 Bob Dylan- Empire Burlesque 1985 Robin Clark-Surrender 1986 Various – Star Search The Winners Album 1986 Brian Setzer-The Knife Feels Like Justice
 1986 Bob Dylan-Knocked Out Loaded
 1987 Ronee Martin-Sensation 1988 Barbra Streisand-Till I Loved You
 1988 Bob Dylan-Down in the Groove
 1989 The Manhattans-Sweet Talk 1989 Quincy Jones-Back on the Block
 1989 Tracy Chapman-Crossroads
 1989 Various-Urban Cruising (Duet w/Bert Robinson)
 1989 Bianca-Forever 1990 Thelma Houston-Throw You Down 1990 Kylie Minogue-Rhythm Of Love
 1990 Laura Branigan-Laura Branigan
 1992 Leonard Cohen-The Future 1992 Various-Expansions Soul Sauce Vol. 1 (Love Is The Magic)
 1993 Young M.C.-What's The Flavor? 1993 Sonya Barry-The World Is Like A Shadow 1995 Melissa Manchester-If My Heart Had Wings 1996 Christopher Young-Set It Off (Original Motion Picture Score)
 1999 Various-Vibrafinger 2002 Young M.C.-Engage The Enzyme 2004 Ron Dante-Saturday Night Blast 2010 Various-Christmas at Sedsoul (The Christmas Song)
 2010 Cool Million- Back For More (I See You)
 2012 Cool Million- III (When We Loved & What About You)
 2021 Take Me Higher - Filip Grönlund ft. Peggi Blu

 Main albums discography 
 1980 I Got Love (MCA Records)
 1987 Blu Blowin (Capitol Records)
 2002 Livin' On Love'' (Expansions)

References

External links 
 
 
 
 

Living people
People from Lumberton, North Carolina
American disco musicians
21st-century African-American women singers
American rhythm and blues singers
Year of birth missing (living people)